Licibořice is a municipality and village in Chrudim District in the Pardubice Region of the Czech Republic. It has about 300 inhabitants.

Administrative parts
The village of Šiškovice and the hamlet of Slavice are administrative parts of Licibořice.

References

External links

Villages in Chrudim District